The women's 60 metres hurdles event at the 1970 European Athletics Indoor Championships was held on 14 and 15 March in Vienna.

Medalists

Results

Heats
Held on 14 March

First 4 from each heat (Q) qualified directly for the semifinals.

Semifinals
Held on 14 March

First 3 from each heat (Q) qualified directly for the final.

Final
Held on 15 March

References

60 metres hurdles at the European Athletics Indoor Championships
60